Massimiliano Mazzucchi (born 2 October 1980) is a former Italian diver. Born in Rome, he competed in the men's 10 metre platform events at the 2000 and 2004 Summer Olympics.

References

External links

1980 births
Living people
Divers at the 2000 Summer Olympics
Divers at the 2004 Summer Olympics
Italian male divers
Olympic divers of Italy
Divers from Rome